Isa Qosja (born in Vuthaj, Montenegro in 1949) is an Albanian film director. After gymnasium he studied dramatic art and acting in faculty of Prishtina.

Life and career

After he studied Academy of film, theater, radio and television in Belgrade.

Isa Qosja is the author of many artistic and documentary films, among the best known is "Proka" which has featured in many international festivals, including the RIFJ Cannes. His second feature film, "Rojat e Mjegullës" (1988) dealt with the suffering and treatment of Albanians in time of the great communist repression.

In 2005 he directed Kukumi.

In 2014 he directed "Tri Dritare dhe Nje Varje" (Three Windows and a Hanging), which became the first Kosovan film to be submitted for the Academy Award for Best Foreign Language Film but it didn't get nominated.

Filmography and awards

Proka (1985) 
Grand Prix on RIFJ, Cannes, 1986
Prix des Jury de Jeunes aux Rencontres 
Internationales du Film et Jeunesse de RIFJ Cannes, 1986
2nd Prize of the Public RIFJ Canes 1986
 ROJET E MJEGULLËS 1987 
Best original music - Pula Festival 1987
The best film - Pardubice
 KUKUMI (2005)
Special Jury Prize, Sarajevo Film Festival, Bosnia-Herzegovina
62 Mostra International Cinematography di Venetia, Regione di Venetio, Award 2005
Sophie International film Festival - "NISIMASA" Award, 2006
The best film - Albanian Film Festival, Tirana, 2006
The best Director - Albanian Film festival, Tirana, 2006
The best feature film, drama - Spokane International Film Festival USA, 2006
Grand Prize - Film festival Cinema des authors in Morocco, 2007
Best Twenty Five Films in the last twenty five years in Vienna Film Festival.
TRI DRITARE DHE NJË VARJE 2014
Postproduction Award, Sarajevo Film Festival
Sarajevo Film Festival – Cineuropa Award
Cottbus Film Festival- Germany, Special Mention Award
Cottbus Film Festival- Germany, Dialogue award for Intercultural Communication.
Lexembourg City Film Festival Prize de la critique
Berlin -Cinema for Peace and Justice Award
Durrës International Film Festival- Golden Gladiator
Palm Springs International Film Festival - Cinema without borders Award
Cyprus Film Festival- Best Film Award
Cyprus Film Festival - Student Jury Award
Best of Best Award - Washington Film Festival
Heartland Film Festival - Narrative Feature award Winner
Festival International du cinema Mediterranean de Montpellier– Critic Award
Festival International du cinema Mediterranean de Montpellier– Nova Award
Jerusalem International Film Festival – Best Feature Film Award
International Crime and Punishment Film Festival - Istanbul –Best Feature Film Award
Arpa International Film Festival – Best Screenplay
Thessaloniki International Film Festival – Audience Award
Roshford Film Festival – Best Feature Film
Tetouan International Mediterranean Film Festival – Grand Prix of the City of Tetouan

References

External links

Isa Qosja, Official Web Site

Living people
Albanian film directors
1949 births